Ali Aziz oghlu Ibadullayev (born April 11, 1951) is an Azerbaijani sculptor and painter.

Biography 
Ali Ibadullayev was born on April 11, 1951, in the village of Amirjan in Baku. In 1966–1970 he studied at Azim Azimzade Azerbaijan State Art School and in 1970–1975 at Stroganov Moscow Higher School of Arts and Industry. He has been a member of Union of Artists of the USSR and Azerbaijan since 1978.

Career 
Ali Ibadullayev is mostly known as a sculptor. He has worked with his colleague, Salhab Mammadov, on most of the sculptures since 2006. In this regard, his "Mugam" (2009, Baku), "Monument to Farman Salmanov" (2009, Yugra, Russia), "Khojaly" (2011, Berlin), "Dervishes" (2011, Baku), "Monument to Nizami Ganjavi" (2012, Rome), "Lights of Absheron" (2012, Baku), "Monument of Azerbaijan–Poland friendship" (2013, Gniezno, Poland), "Memorial plaque to water engineer Stefan Skshyvan" (2013, Lodz, Poland), "Memorial plaque to Rasim Ojagov" (2013, Baku), "Monument to Pavel Pototsky" (2015, Krakow, Poland), "Pomegranate Monument" (2015, Goychay). His "Wind" and "Comet" sculptures, placed in front of the Museum of Modern Art in Baku, are examples of his independent works.

Abstract paintings cover a significant part among the artist's creative works. In this respect, his large-scale triptychs such as, "Mugam", "Khazar", "Volcano", "Absheron Motif", as well as "Movement", "Pink Flowers", "Flight", "Pomegranate", "Vineyard" are notable.

In 2011, Ali Ibadullayev's solo exhibition was held in Berlin, Germany. His works are kept in various museums in Azerbaijan, Russia, Germany, Canada and private collections in Spain, Italy, France, Belgium, Denmark, Sweden, Netherlands, Great Britain, Turkey, Switzerland, Japan, Algeria, USA, Venezuela and other countries.

Awards 
 People's Artist of the Republic of Azerbaijan — December 30, 2015
 Honored Artist of the Republic of Azerbaijan — December 29, 2006
 Prize of International Committee of the Red Cross — 1996
 "Zirva" Award — March 9, 2012

Gallery

References

External links 

 
 
 
 
 
 
 
 
 

1951 births
20th-century Azerbaijani sculptors
21st-century Azerbaijani sculptors
20th-century Azerbaijani painters
21st-century Azerbaijani painters
Living people
Stroganov Moscow State Academy of Arts and Industry alumni